The National Magazine Awards, also known as the Ellie Awards, honor print and digital publications that consistently demonstrate superior execution of editorial objectives, innovative techniques, noteworthy enterprise and imaginative design. Originally limited to print magazines, the awards now recognize magazine-quality journalism published in any medium. They are sponsored by the American Society of Magazine Editors (ASME) in association with Columbia University Graduate School of Journalism, and are administered by ASME in New York City. The awards have been presented annually since 1966.

The Ellie Awards are judged by magazine journalists and journalism educators selected by the administrators of the awards. More than 300 judges participate every year. Each judge is assigned to a judging group that averages 15 judges, including a judging leader. Each judging group chooses five finalists (seven in Reporting and Feature Writing); the same judging group selects one of the finalists to be the winner of the Ellie Award in that category. Judging results are subject to the approval of the National Magazine Awards Board, which is composed of current and former officers of ASME, the dean of the Columbia University Graduate School of Journalism, and veteran judges.

The current categories are:

 General Excellence, News, Sports and Entertainment
 General Excellence, Service and Lifestyle
 General Excellence, Special Interest
 General Excellence, Literature, Science and Politics
 Design and Photography, News and Opinion
 Design and Photography, Service and Lifestyle
 Feature Photography
 Website, News and Opinion
 Website, Service and Lifestyle
 Digital Innovation
 Social Media
 Podcasting
 Video, News and Opinion
 Video, Service and Lifestyle
 Single-Topic Issue
 Personal Service
 Leisure Interests
 Reporting
 Feature Writing
 Essays and Criticism
 Columns and Commentary
 Public Interest

Finalists in each of the Ellie Award categories receive certificates of recognition. The winner in each category receives a reproduction of Alexander Calder's stabile "Elephant", the symbol of the awards since 1970. Among the notable changes for 2017 are the expansion of the Design and Photography categories to include digital entries and the suspension of the Fiction award.

Current categories

General Excellence
Honors print and digital magazines in several categories based on content and audience.

Businessweek received the first ever award in 1973.  No award was given from 1974 through 1980. When General Excellence returned as a category in 1981, it was given to four magazines per year until 1998, when five magazines received General Excellence awards.  Six magazines received awards in 2002. From 2003 to 2010, the award went to seven different magazines and in 2011, to eight.  Since 2012, the award has gone to six magazines.

Starting 2016, it is defined into four groups: "News, Sports and Entertainment", "Service and Lifestyle", "Special Interest", "Literature, Science and Politics".

Feature Writing
Honors original, stylish storytelling. Incorporates Profile writing as of 2013.

Essays and Criticism
Category previously known as "Criticism & Belle-Lettres" (1977) and Essays (2000–10). Honors "long-form journalism that presents the opinions of the writer on topics ranging from the personal to the political".

Columns and Commentary
Honors political and social commentary; news analysis; and reviews and criticism.

Former categories

National Magazine Award
For the first four years of the National Magazine Awards, only one award was given.

1966

Look "for its skillful editing, imagination and editorial integrity, all of which were reflected particularly in its treatment of the racial issue during 1965."

1967

LIFE "in recognition of skillful, imaginative and constructive editing as reflected particularly in vivid photo reporting of the war in Vietnam, outstanding coverage of the civil rights issue, and effective support for the preservation of great works of art—in keeping with an admirable tradition of public education on cultural subjects."

1968

Newsweek "in recognition of that magazine's development of a new form of editorial analysis and advocacy in its major effort to present America's racial problems. The 'program of action,' published in Newsweek's issue of November 20, 1967, was a 23 page article combining reportage, analysis and opinion under the title 'The Negro in America: What Must Be Done.' The judges considered the project, clearly labeled as a departure from Newsweek’s standard policy, to have been skillfully and responsibly executed. They consider it a useful and important form, when sparingly used, in the news magazine field."

1969

American Machinist, a McGraw-Hill trade publication, which was recognized for its special issue, "Will John Garth Make It?" The study of U.S. industry's role in combating unemployment, especially among those that companies might consider unemployable, included Mr. Garth, a 26-year-old high school dropout and parolee.

Certificates of Special Recognition
Identifying one winner was no doubt a challenge for the judges in the first years of the National Magazine Awards. It was decided from the start that Certificates of Special Recognition as well as commendations would be given.

1966

Scientific American "for general excellence in its field and, particularly, for its special issue, drawing on many disciplines, dealing with the broad subject of urbanization"
Grade Teacher "for its high quality treatment of important new subjects, conspicuously improved use of illustration and practical service to its readership—all within the limitations of a modest budget"
Ebony "for imaginative and forceful treatment of social questions as reflected particularly in its issue on 'The White Problem in America'"

1967

 Motive "for editorial vitality, for tasteful innovation in design, and for forthright treatment of delicate issues that once would have been taboo in religious-affiliated publications"

1968

Esquire "for its editorial creativity and diversity its original typographical and pictorial presentation, and its penetrating reporting of character and social trends as exemplified in its submitted article about Jack Ruby"
LIFE "for its uncompromising and well documented series exposing the scale of organized crime in the United States and for its pursuit of new facets of the subject"
Vogue "for visual grace, wit and innovation accompanied by printed content in harmony with its high graphic standard"

Commendation
Nine titles were commended at the first annual National Magazine Awards. This was the only year such recognition was given.

1966

TIME "for the innovation of its well researched, expertly written and balanced series of ‘TIME Essays.’"
The New Yorker "for its skillful editing and for its flair for dramatic innovation as demonstrated by its publication of Truman Capote’s ‘In Cold Blood.’"
American Machinist "for its comprehensive treatment of the balance of payments problem as it affects industry."
Continuum "for its role, as a Roman Catholic magazine of small circulation, in delving into controversy and presenting strong conviction and thorough research in a handsome format."
 Motive "for skillful and dramatic presentations of major issues in a small-circulation Protestant magazine."
Vogue "for its effective use of color in editorial pages."
Fortune "for its clear and thoughtful presentations, including its series offering a fresh look at the influence of automation."
TV Guide "for dealing thoughtfully with controversial topics in a setting where others might have settled for fan-appeal trivia."
LIFE "for overall skill in dealing with contemporary civilization, cultural subjects and public affairs."

Special Award

Specialized Journalism

Profile Writing
Previously known as Profiles (2000–2001). Honors excellence in profile writing by recognizing the vividness and perceptiveness with which the writer brings his or her subject to life.

Reviews and Criticism
Honors excellence in criticism of art, books, movies, television, theater, music, dance, food, dining, fashion, products and the like by recognizing the knowledge, persuasiveness and original voice that the critic brings to his or her reviews.

News and Documentary Photography
Previously known as Photojournalism (2007–2010) and News Photography (2011–2012). Honors excellence in the informative photographic documentation of an event or subject in real-time.

Photography, Digital Media
Honors overall excellence in the design of magazine websites and online-only magazines.

General Excellence in Digital Media
Previously known as General Excellence in New Media (1997–2000), General Excellence Online (2001–2009) and General Excellence, Digital Media (2010–2013).

Design, Digital Media
Previously known as Best Interactive Design (2001). Honors overall excellence in the design of magazine websites and online-only magazines.

Reporting, Digital Media
Previously known as News Reporting (2010–2011). Honors overall excellence in the design of magazine websites and online-only magazines.

Personal Service, Digital Media
Previously known as Interactive Service (2007) and Personal Service Online (2008–2008). Honors a site’s effective use of multimedia technology to deliver information that users can act on to improve the quality of their personal lives or enjoy recreational pursuits.

Commentary, Digital Media
Previously known as Blogging (2010–2011). Honors excellence in opinion journalism on digital platforms.

Website Department
Previously known as Regular Department or Section (2010) and Online Department (2011). Honors a regularly updated, clearly branded department or channel.

Utility App
Previously known as Interactive Feature (2007–2009) and Interactive Tool (2010–2011). Honors an outstanding app, feature or section of a website that uses multimedia technology, tools, community platforms or other interactive formats to deliver or share content such as news, information and entertainment, rather than practical instruction or advice.

Community

Tablet Magazine
Previously known as Mobile Media (2010), Mobile Edition (2011) and Tablet Edition (2012).  Honors magazines published on tablets and e-readers, including digital-only magazines.

Multimedia
Previously known as Multimedia Feature or Package (2010) and Multimedia Package (2011).  Honors digital storytelling and the integration of magazine media.

Magazine of the Year
Honors magazines for editorial excellence as demonstrated in print and on digital platforms for the quality and consistency of magazine-branded content and services produced by or associated with the publication, including but not limited to conferences and events; books; and radio and television programs.

Magazine Section
Honors a regularly published front- or back-of-the-book department or section.

Fiction
Previously known as Fiction & Belle-Lettres (1974 -1976). Honors fiction originally published in magazines. Last awarded in 2016. Succeeded by the ASME Awards for Fiction in 2018.

See also

 List of literary awards

References

External links

NMA Searchable Database

Awards established in 1966
1966 establishments in the United States
American literary awards
Magazine awards
American journalism awards
Journalism lists
Awards and prizes of Columbia University
Columbia University Graduate School of Journalism